The News with Brian Williams (later known as The News on CNBC) was an American news program that premiered on July 15, 1996, MSNBC's first day on the air. It was the first flagship signature news broadcast on both MSNBC and CNBC. The show was hosted by Brian Williams. The News was a broadcast designed mainly for primetime viewers who might have missed that night's NBC Nightly News.

The News was originally shown at 9:00pm ET on MSNBC until July 6, 2001. It was moved to the 8pm time slot on July 9, 2001.

During the 2000 United States presidential election, The News was the main program for MSNBC's coverage.

John Seigenthaler (and later various hosts such as Soledad O'Brien, Forrest Sawyer, and some of the presenters from CNBC and MSNBC) often substituted for Williams during his absence, mainly because of Williams' duties as substitute on NBC Nightly News with Tom Brokaw.

The News on CNBC

In July 2002, MSNBC canceled The News, in order to make room for Phil Donahue's new MSNBC series. The News was then only shown on CNBC at 7:00pm ET, and was the main news broadcast on CNBC. Viewership of The News suffered.

In 2002, NBC announced that Brian Williams would take over from Tom Brokaw on NBC Nightly News in 2004. In the beginning of 2004, Williams stepped down as presenter of The News, and the show's substitute, John Seigenthaler, took over as the new host of The News, which was renamed The News on CNBC.

When Seigenthaler took over on January 19, 2004, The News moved to the 8:00pm ET time slot. The final edition of The News was on May 14, 2004, exactly one week after the cancellation announcement.

On September 30, 2020, CNBC revived The News with a new anchor in Shepard Smith (formerly of Fox News).

See also
NBC Nightly News
The 11th Hour (an MSNBC program originally anchored by Williams)
The News with Shepard Smith

References

External links
 

MSNBC original programming
CNBC original programming
1996 American television series debuts
2004 American television series endings
1990s American television news shows
2000s American television news shows
English-language television shows